Articles about Baekje-related people, places, things, and concepts include:

A
 Abe no Hirafu
 Ajikgi
 Asin of Baekje

B

 Baekje
 Battle of Baekgang
 Battle of Hwangsanbeol
 Beop of Baekje
 Biryu of Baekje
 Biyu of Baekje
 Gwisil Boksin
 Bunseo of Baekje
 Buyeo County
 Buyeo National Museum
 Buyeo Pung
 Buyeo Yung

C

 Chaekgye of Baekje
 Chiljido
 Chogo of Baekje

D

 Daifang commandery
 Daru of Baekje
 Dongseong of Baekje

G

 Gaero of Baekje
 Gaeru of Baekje
 Geunchogo of Baekje
 Geungusu of Baekje
 Gilt-bronze Incense Burner of Baekje
 Giru of Baekje
 Goi of Baekje
 Guisin of Baekje
 Gusu of Baekje
 Gwalleuk, Buddhist monk who traveled to Japan.
 Gye of Baekje
 Gyeon Hwon

H

 Hye of Baekje

J

 Jeonji of Baekje
 Jinsa of Baekje

M

 Mahan confederacy
 Mu of Baekje
 Munju of Baekje
 Muryeong of Baekje

N
Neungsan-ri

O

 Onjo of Baekje

P

 Pungnap Toseong

S

 Saban of Baekje
 Sabi
 Samgeun of Baekje
 Seong of Baekje

U

 Uija of Baekje
 Ungjin

W
 Wang In
 Wideok of Baekje
 Wiryeseong

See also
History of Korea
Rulers of Korea
Three Kingdoms of Korea

B
Indexes of topics by region